Jocelyn Jones-Lybarger is an American former mixed martial artist who competed in the Strawweight division of the UFC and has competed in Invicta. She competed at UFC Fight Night: MacDonald vs. Thompson. On January 19, 2017, she announced her retirement from MMA on her facebook page.

Personal life
Jones-Lybarger has a twin sister named Jillian, who is also a mixed martial artist. Their older sister Shannon is the retired pornographic actress Dylan Ryder. Jocelyn Jones-Lybarger is a fan of the Los Angeles Chargers.

Championships and achievements

Mixed martial arts
Resurrection Fighting Alliance
 RFA Strawweight Title (One time)
Tuff-N-Uff
 Amateur Tuff-N-Uff Strawweight Title (One time)

Mixed martial arts record

|-
|Loss
|align=center|6–4
|Nina Ansaroff
|Submission (rear-naked choke)
|UFC Fight Night: Rodríguez vs. Penn 
|
|align="center"|3
|align="center"|3:39
|Phoenix, Arizona, United States
|
|-
|Loss
|align=center|6–3
|Randa Markos
|Decision (unanimous)
|UFC Fight Night: MacDonald vs. Thompson
|
|align=center|3
|align=center|5:00
|Ottawa, Ontario, Canada
|
|-
|Loss
|align=center|6–2
|Tecia Torres
|Decision (unanimous)
|UFC 194 
|
|align=center|3
|align=center|5:00
|Las Vegas, Nevada, United States
|
|-
|Win
|align=center|6–1
|Zoila Frausto
|Decision (unanimous)
|RFA 31
|
|align=center|3
|align=center|5:00
|Las Vegas, Nevada, United States
|
|-
|Win
|align=center|5–1
|Maria Rios
|Decision (unanimous)
|RFA 23
|
|align=center|3
|align=center|5:00
|Costa Mesa, California, United States
|
|-
|Win
|align=center|4–1
|Rebecca Ruth
|Decision (split)
|RFA 19
|
|align=center|3
|align=center|5:00
|Prior Lake, Minnesota, United States
|
|-
|Win
|align=center|3–1
|Rosa Acevedo
|Decision (unanimous)
|RFA 14 
|
|align=center|3
|align=center|5:00
|Cheyenne, Wyoming, United States
|
|-
|Loss
|align=center|2–1
|Sarah Alpar
|Decision (unanimous)
|KOTC - Heated Fury
|
|align=center|3
|align=center|5:00
|Scottsdale, Arizona, United States
|
|-
|Win
|align=center|2–0
|Jessica Armstrong-Kennett
|Submission (guillotine choke)
|KOTC: World Championships 
|
|align=center|1
|align=center|0:27
|Scottsdale, Arizona, United States
|
|-
|Win
|align=center|1–0
|Cheryl Chan
|Decision (unanimous)
|Invicta FC 2 - Baszler vs. McMann 
|
|align=center|3
|align=center|5:00
|Kansas City, Kansas, United States
|

Amateur mixed martial arts record

|-
|Win
|align=center| 4–2
|Ashley Yoder
|Decision (split)
|Tuff-N-Uff - The Fist-ival
|
|align=center|3
|align=center|3:00
|Las Vegas, Nevada, United States
|Won the Amateur Tuff-N-Uff Strawweight Title.
|-
|Loss
|align=center| 3–2
|Stephanie Gonzalez
|Decision (split)
|Momentum FC - Fight Night 3
|
|align=center|3
|align=center|2:00
|Anaheim, California, United States
|
|-
|Loss
|align=center| 3–1
|Ashley Cummins
|Submission (armbar)
|Tuff-N-Uff - Future Stars of MMA
|
|align=center|1
|align=center|1:42
|Las Vegas, Nevada, United States
|For Amateur Tuff-N-Uff Strawweight Title.
|-
|Win
|align=center| 3–0
|Diana Fowles
|KO (punches)
|Rage in the Cage 148
|
|align=center|1
|align=center|1:08
|Chandler, Arizona, United States
|
|-
|Win
|align=center| 2–0
|Kathryn Davis
|Decision (unanimous)
|Ultimate Reno Combat 20
|
|align=center|3
|align=center|3:00
|Reno, Nevada, United States
|
|-
|Win
|align=center| 1–0
|Amanda Lauland
|Decision (unanimous)
|Tuff-N-Uff
|
|align=center|3
|align=center|2:00
|Las Vegas, Nevada, United States
|

Bare knuckle boxing record

|-
|Loss
|align=center|0–1
|Martyna Krol	
|TKO (doctor stoppage)	
|BKFC Fight Night: Jackson
|
|align=center|3
|align=center|2:00
|Jackson, Mississippi, United States

References

External links
 
 
 

1985 births
Mixed martial artists from California
People from Fresno, California
Sportspeople from Orange County, California
American people of German descent
American people of Italian descent
American female mixed martial artists
Strawweight mixed martial artists
Flyweight mixed martial artists
Mixed martial artists utilizing Brazilian jiu-jitsu
Living people
Twin sportspeople
LGBT mixed martial artists
American practitioners of Brazilian jiu-jitsu
LGBT Brazilian jiu-jitsu practitioners
Ultimate Fighting Championship female fighters
21st-century American women